The 2022 Florida Commissioner of Agriculture election was held on November 8, 2022, to elect the Florida Commissioner of Agriculture. Incumbent Democratic Commissioner of Agriculture Nikki Fried was eligible to run for a second term, but she instead ran for governor of Florida in 2022. Republican Wilton Simpson won the election with over 59% of the vote. Simpson’s victory gave Republicans complete control of state government for the first time since Reconstruction.

Democratic primary

Candidates

Declared 
 Ryan Morales, marketing consultant
Naomi Esther Blemur, accountant
J.R. Gaillot, policy consultant, candidate for Florida's 3rd congressional district in 2012 and state representative in 2016

Withdrawn
 Adam Christensen, nominee for Florida's 3rd congressional district in 2020

Declined 
 Gary Farmer, state senator and former Florida Senate minority leader
 Melissa McKinlay, Palm Beach County commissioner and former mayor of Palm Beach County
 Nikki Fried, incumbent commissioner of agriculture (running for governor)

Endorsements

Results

Republican primary

Candidates

Declared 
 James Shaw, businessman
Wilton Simpson, president of the Florida Senate

Did not qualify 
Bob White

Withdrawn 
Chuck Nadd, Afghanistan veteran
 Richard Olle, agriculture inspector

Declined 
 Matt Caldwell, Lee County property appraiser, former state representative, and nominee for commissioner of agriculture in 2018
Tom Rooney, former U.S. representative for

Endorsements

Results

General election

Endorsements

Polling

Results

Notes

See also 

 Florida Commissioner of Agriculture

Reference

External links 

 Florida Division of Elections Candidate Tracking System
Official campaign websites
 Naomi Blemur (D) for Commissioner of Agriculture
 Wilton Simpson (R) for Commissioner of Agriculture

Commissioner of Agriculture
Florida Commissioner of Agriculture
Florida Commissioner of Agriculture elections